Rifat Ozbek (born 1953) is a Turkish-born fashion designer, known for his exotic, ethnically-inspired outfits. He was named British Designer of the Year in 1988 and 1992.

Biography 
Ozbek was born in Istanbul, Turkey and grew up in a yalı on the Bosphorus. He came to the UK to study architecture at the University of Liverpool in 1970, graduating in 1972. He then lived in his parents' flat in Belgravia while studying fashion at Saint Martin's School of Art from 1974 to 1977.

After graduating in 1977, Ozbek went to Italy where he worked in Milan between 1978 and 1980, then in London with Monsoon. In 1984 he established his own company, Ozbek, and began to show his yearly collections in Milan and New York City, and more recently, in Paris.

In 1987 the production of his studio line, Future Ozbek, was licensed to Aeffe SpA, in Italy, and his notoriety continued to grow. By 1995, he had launched his own perfume called "Ozbek", and later a second, "Ozbek 1001".

The fall 1999/spring 2000 collections of many designers reflected the very aesthetic that Ozbek valued for over a decade—the artful mixing of unlikely patterns, shapes, and ornamentation, along with bits and pieces borrowed from a global grab bag.

In 2010, Ozbek launched a new business called "Yastik", which means "pillow" in Turkish, and opened his first London store. Özbek was an interior designer for Robin Birley's new nightclub, 5 Hertford Street, which opened in 2012.

He lives between London, Istanbul and Bodrum, where he resides with his partner Erdal Karaman.

Style
Ozbek is inspired by adornment. He is an observer of culture and subculture, from Tibetan to American Indian, and his interest in decoration is evident in his ornamental clothing. He gained notoriety by combining the decorative symbols and shapes of diverse cultures, such as the Far East, Africa, and his native Turkey, with the classic silhouettes of the West. Ozbek created eclectic clothing which encouraged the urban consumer to embrace "ethnic chic". His use of embroidery, tassels, and vivid colors like turquoise and fuchsia was completely at odds with 1980s power dressing; nevertheless, his antifashion approach to modern dressing received quite a bit of attention from those who appreciated the departure from sharp-edged suiting.

Ozbek's designs reflected both club scene and New Age influences, when in 1990, he made clear his faith in spiritualism by presenting an all-white collection. His popularity continued throughout the 1990s as he continued his investigation of culture and subculture, taking street fashion to the runway with the addition of baseball caps covered with sequins.

Awards
1986: Woman Magazine Designer Award
1988: British Designer of the Year 
1989: British Glamour Award 
1992: British Designer of the Year

References

External links
Official website

Living people
1953 births
Turkish fashion designers
Turkish emigrants to the United Kingdom
Turkish artists
British artists
British fashion designers
Alumni of Saint Martin's School of Art
Turkish LGBT artists
English LGBT people
LGBT fashion designers